Credito Italiano also known as just Credit, was an Italian bank, now part of UniCredit. It was merged with Unicredito in 1998, forming Unicredito Italiano (now UniCredit). Circa 1999 to 2002 UniCredit created a new subsidiary of the same name to run the retail network of Credito Italiano. On 1 July 2002 the subsidiary received the assets of sister banks to become UniCredit Banca.

History
Founded on 28 April 1870 in Genoa as  Banca di Genova, it took part in the establishment of the Bank of Italy and opened the first trans-Atlantic banking business with Buenos Aires (1872).  
Local shareholders were local nobility (Pallavicino and Balbi), bankers (Quartara, Polleri) and merchants (Lagorio, Dodero, Bacigalupo), creating an initial capital of 3 million Italian lira. It acquired "Banca Vonwiller" of Milan.

In the 1890s, the international financial crisis led to refinancing by German and Swiss banks and name change to "Credito Italiano" (1895) With a paid-in capital of 14 million lire. It now became a major national bank Later, it acquired "Banca Manzi" of Rome (1901) and "Banca Meuricoffre" of Naples (1905).  Its headquarters moved to Piazza Cordusio opened a branch office in London in 1911.  By 1913 the equity capital reached 75 million lire, and its savings and demand deposits grew very rapidly. It became a major source of funding for Italian industry in the prosperous years 1896-1913, especially iron and steel, electric power, sugar-beet refining, urban transportation, and chemicals.

First World War
At the commencement of the First World War, the executive directors of Credito Italiano and the Banca Commerciale Italiana – another German funded bank in Italy – were officially in favour of neutrality. However these banks were the subject of a campaign by both Italian nationalists, spearheaded by L'Idea Nazionale and Liberals grouped around Francesco Saverio Nitti. Both these political initiatives had links with business rivals Gio. Ansaldo & C. and Banca Italiana di Sconto.

Post war expansion
Following the war it acquired the "Banca del Monferrato", "Banca di Legnano", "Credito Varesino and the Swiss Banca Unione di Credito (1919), and in 1920 it joined the "Compagnia Finanziaria Nazionale" (1920); and established "Banca Italo-cinese", the "Banca Italo Viennese" and "Tiroler Hauptbank" (1920). In 1921 it opened offices in Paris  and Berlin and later contributed to the establishments of Banca Italo Egiziana (1924) and Banca Nazionale di Albania (1925).It was highly profitable in the boom years 1922 – 1925, thanks to the success of Italian industry. Decline set in after 1925.

Italian government introduced a law that forced bank to separate short term loan and medium loan business in 1936.  Credito Italiano, along with two other "bank of national interests", BCI and Banco di Roma, had formed Mediobanca in 1946.

Privatization and expansion
In the 1990s the bank became a private company, as Italian government sold the stake of the bank. The bank also acquired Banca Popolare di Spoleto (about 50%) in 1992 and Banca Cattolica di Molfetta (35%) in 1994.

In 1995 the bank acquired a majority interests in Credito Romagnolo (and its subsidiary Banca Popolare del Molise) and Carimonte Banca (and its subsidiary Banca Popolare di Rieti), which was merged into Rolo Banca, except Banca Popolare di Rieti was spin off from Carimonte.

Formation of UniCredito Italiano
In late 1998 Credito Italiano was merged with Unicredito, which Unicredito was absorbed into Credito Italiano, and Credito Italiano was renamed into UniCredito Italiano. The original shareholders of Unicredito would owned about 38.46% shares of UniCredito Italiano.

In the same year Banca Popolare di Spoleto (July), Banca Cattolica di Molfetta (October) were sold, as well as Banca Popolare del Molise and Banca Popolare di Rieti were merged into Rolo Banca and UniCredit in June 1998 and 1999. In December 1999, Credito Italiano was reestablished as a subsidiary (instead of a division within the company).

UniCredit Banca

On 1 July 2002, Credito Italiano, as a subsidiary, was renamed to UniCredit Banca, which received the retail bank assets from Rolo Banca, Banca CRT, Cariverona Banca, Cassamarca, Cassa di Risparmio di Trento e Rovereto and Cassa di Risparmio di Trieste. On 1 January 2003 UniCredit Private Banking and UniCredit Banca d'Impresa were spin off from UniCredit Banca. In 2010 the bank was completely absorbed into UniCredit.

See also

 Banco di Chiavari e della Riviera Ligure, another Ligurian bank
 Banca Carige, another Genoa-based bank

References

Further reading
 Cohen, Jon S. "Financing industrialization in Italy, 1894–1914: The partial transformation of a late-comer." Journal of Economic History 27.3 (1967): 363-382.
 Gale Directory of Company Histories. "Credito Italiano" (2012)  online
 Pohl, Manfred, ed. Handbook on the history of European banks (Edward Elgar Publishing, 1994) pp 652–55.
 Sraffa, Piero. "The bank crisis in Italy." Economic Journal 32.126 (1922): 178-197.   online
Vasta, Michelangelo, and Alberto Baccini. "Banks and industry in Italy, 1911–36: new evidence using the interlocking directorates technique." Financial History Review 4.2 (1997): 139-159.

External links
  (currently redirect to UniCredit)

Defunct banks of Italy
 *
Credito Italiano Group
Former UniCredit subsidiaries
Banks established in 1870
Banks disestablished in 2002
Italian companies established in 1870
Italian companies disestablished in 2002
Formerly government-owned companies of Italy
Companies based in Genoa
Companies based in Milan
Re-established companies